Öykü Karayel (born 21 August 1990) is a Turkish actress.

Life and career
Born in 1990 in Istanbul, Öykü Karayel graduated from Çemberlitaş Girls High School. She has a twin sister. After receiving a short period of training at Kenter Theater, she entered the Theater Department of the State Conservatory of Istanbul University in 2007. While she was still a conservatory student she played the lead character of Ayşe in the theatre Güzel Şeyler Bizim Tarafta. Her performance in a play at Theatre Krek was drawn to the attention of the screenwriter Ece Yörenç. At the time he was searching a new actor for the TV series Kuzey Güney to play the character Cemre and she was chosen for it. At the end of June 2017 she started acting in a TV series called Kalp Atışı playing the role of Eylül Erdem.

Filmography

Film

Series

Theatre

Awards

References

1990 births
Living people
Turkish Muslims
Actresses from Istanbul
Turkish television actresses
Turkish stage actresses
Turkish film actresses